Agama sankaranica, also known as the Senegal agama, is a species of agamid lizard. It has a wide geographical distribution across West Africa, possibly reaching Cameroon in Central Africa. It is called mbuwo in the Mwaghavul language of Nigeria.

References

sankaranica
Agamid lizards of Africa
Reptiles of West Africa
Reptiles of Nigeria
Reptiles described in 1918
Taxa named by Paul Chabanaud